Mudrey Cirque is a cirque between Northwest Mountain and West Groin in the south part of Asgard Range, Victoria Land. Named by Advisory Committee on Antarctic Names (US-ACAN) for Michael G. Mudrey, Jr., United States Antarctic Research Program (USARP) geologist with the Dry Valley Drilling Project in Victoria Land in three seasons, 1972–75.

Cirques of Antarctica
Landforms of Victoria Land
McMurdo Dry Valleys